"A Taste of Armageddon" is the twenty-third episode of the first season of the American science fiction television series Star Trek. Written by Robert Hamner and Gene L. Coon and directed by Joseph Pevney, it was first broadcast on February 23, 1967.

In the episode, the crew of the Enterprise visits a planet engaged in a completely computer-simulated war with a neighboring planet, but the casualties, including the Enterprises crew, are supposed to be real.

Plot
The USS Enterprise travels to Eminiar VII in NGC 321, bringing Ambassador Robert Fox to establish diplomatic relations. Little is known about Eminiar VII, beyond the fact that they have been at war with a neighboring planet, Vendikar.

Nearing Eminiar VII, the Enterprise receives a message from the planet warning them not to approach, but Ambassador Fox orders Captain Kirk to proceed. Kirk, First Officer Spock, and additional security personnel beam down to the planet, where they are met by representatives Mea 3 and Anan 7. During a supposed attack by Vendikar, Anan 7 explains that the war is conducted as a computer simulation, and that the Enterprise has been "destroyed" in the attack. The two planets have a treaty, according to which they have to kill the "victims" of every simulated attack. The crew are thereby expected to report to Eminiar's disintegration chambers for execution, and Kirk's party is taken captive. Spock telepathically plants a suggestion in their jailer's mind, allowing them to escape.

Anan 7 uses a voice duplicator to imitate Kirk's voice and order the crew to transport down. Scotty, suspicious, has the ship's computer analyze the message and confirms it is fake. He orders shields raised. When the crew fails to transport down, Eminiar fires upon them, but the attack is deflected by the shields. Anan 7 then contacts the Enterprise, claiming the attack was due to a malfunction. Ambassador Fox, deciding to believe Anan, beams down and is taken to a disintegration chamber along with Mea 3, who was also "killed" in the war simulation. Spock and the security officers rescue them.

Kirk confronts Anan 7 but is overpowered by guards and taken to the Eminian council chamber. When Anan 7 opens a channel to the Enterprise, Kirk orders Scotty to execute General Order 24 before being cut off. Kirk explains that he just ordered the ship to destroy everything on the planet within two hours. Panic ensues, which Kirk takes advantage of to disarm the guards. After Spock arrives, Kirk destroys the war simulation computers. Anan 7 condemns Kirk's actions, arguing that it is unalterable nature to fight wars, so without the simulation they have no alternative but to fight a real war. Kirk instead believes that the only reason the war with Vendikar has gone on so long is because the simulation insulated both societies from the horrors of war and gave them little reason to end it. He convinces Anan 7 to call a ceasefire and begin peace negotiations, and Fox agrees to act as a neutral mediator between the planets.

Reception
The title of "Armageddon Game", a 1994 episode of Star Trek: Deep Space Nine, was chosen by writer Robert Hewitt Wolfe as an homage to this episode.

Zack Handlen of The A.V. Club gave the episode a "B+" rating. He described the story as "one of Treks classic allegorically powerful, common sense implausible scenarios." Handlen criticised a premise that had "a few too many holes to sustain its attempts at profundity" but praised the story's ambition.

In 2016, The Hollywood Reporter rated "A Taste of Armageddon" the 53rd best television episode of all Star Trek franchise television prior to Star Trek: Discovery, including live-action and the animated series, but not counting the movies. Out of just the original series episodes, they ranked it the 18th best episode. In 2016, Business Insider ranked "A Taste of Armageddon" the 11th best episode of the original series.

In 2017, it was rated the 8th most hopeful Star Trek, which despite some grim scenes culminates in the ending of a 500-year-old war. In 2017, Business Insider listed "A Taste of Armageddon" as one of the most underrated episodes of the Star Trek franchise.

In 2018, Collider ranked this episode the 8th best original series episode.

In 2020, ScreenRant ranked it as the 8th best episode of TOS to re-watch.

In 2021, Den of Geek ranked this the number one episode of the original series. That year, the episode was quoted by characters in the science fiction show For All Mankind, in the episode "Triage," where "A Taste of Armageddon" was compared to the series' alternate history Cold War setting.

See also

References

External links

 

 "A Taste of Armageddon" Review of the remastered version at TrekMovie.com

Star Trek: The Original Series (season 1) episodes
1967 American television episodes
Television episodes written by Gene L. Coon
Television episodes directed by Joseph Pevney